Visions is the title of the fourth solo album, a double LP, by the Christian singer-songwriter Paul Field. It is a musical, or rather "a message to the nation that God is great, a message to the church that God  is powerful and a message  to Christians everywhere that God's resources are available to them" (Paul Field, March 1985, cover notes on the Visions LP).

Track listing

Side one
 "Creation" (Paul Field)
 "Solomon's Temple" (Paul Field)
 "Elijah's Contest. Part 1: The prophet's of Baal" (Paul Field)
 "Elijah's Contest. Part 2: Elijah's song" (Paul Field)
 "Elijah's Contest. PArt 3: God answers with fire" (Paul Field)

Side two
 "Ezekiel's Valley. Part 1: Lament" (Paul Field)
 "Exekiel's Valley. Part 2: Valley of dry bones" (Paul Field)
 "Ezekiel's VAlley. PArt 3: Renewal" (Paul Field)
 "Mary's Song" (Paul Field)

Side three
 "Baptism. Part 1: Prepare the way" (Paul Field)
 "Baptism. Part 2: The spirit of the Lord is upon me" (Paul Field)
 "The Cross and the Empty Tomb. Part 1: No greater love" (Paul Field)
 "The Cross and the Empty Tomb. Part 2: The way of the cross" (Paul Field)
 "The Cross and the Empty Tomb. Part 3: The empty tomb" (Paul Field)

Side four
 "River of Life. Part 1: The condemnation of the seven churches" (Paul Field)
 "River of Life. Part 2: God's love, our vision" (Paul Field)

Personnel
Paul Field: Vocals, Keyboards, Guitar, Bass and Drums
Julie Moon: Vocals
Mark Williamson: Vocals
Sharon Armstrong: Vocals
Bernie Armstrong: Vocals
Sue Bassett: Vocals

Production notes
Produced by Paul Field
Engineered by Paul Field
Recorded at "The Billiard Room", Loxwood, Wallington, Surrey

1985 albums
Paul Field (Christian singer) albums